Grant Stewart may refer to:

 Grant Stewart (musician) (born 1971), Canadian jazz saxophonist
 Grant Stewart (cricketer) (born 1994), Australian cricketer
 Grant Stewart (rugby union) (born 1995), Scottish rugby union player